Dick Cooke in a former American college baseball coach, who served primarily as the head coach of the Davidson Wildcats baseball program. He was named to that position prior to the 1991 season, and is the winningest and longest-serving baseball coach in school history.

Playing career
Cooke played at Richmond, earning three varsity letters as a left-handed pitcher.  After graduating with a degree in journalism in 1978, he spent three years in the Boston Red Sox organization at class-A, appearing in 85 games with a 2.95 ERA.

Coaching career
A few years after ending his playing career, Cooke accepted a position as assistant coach at Richmond, where he remained for five seasons.  He departed to become assistant athletic director and head baseball coach at Belmont Abbey in 1989, where he re-instituted the baseball program that had been discontinued at the varsity level 17 years earlier.  After two years with the Crusaders, he accepted the head coaching position at Davidson.  In his time with the Wildcats, ten players have been selected in the Major League Baseball Draft.  Cooke has also worked with USA Baseball, serving as an auxiliary coach at the 2000 Olympic Games and 2008 Olympic Games.  In the summer of 2012, Cooke was named chairman of the NCAA Baseball Rules Committee.  Just a month later, the car Cooke was driving was struck by another vehicle, leaving him with serious head injuries.  After the 2013 season, Cooke was honored with the CollegeBaseballInsider.com's Tom Walter Inspiration Award. Cooke resigned following the 2018 season.

Head coaching record
The table below lists Cooke's record as a head coach at the Division I level.

See also

References

Living people
Baseball players from New Jersey
Belmont Abbey Crusaders baseball coaches
Davidson Wildcats baseball coaches
Sportspeople from Point Pleasant, New Jersey
Richmond Spiders baseball coaches
Richmond Spiders baseball players
Winston-Salem Red Sox players
Winter Haven Red Sox players
1956 births